In Scientology, the security check (or sec check) is an interrogation technique put into practice by founder L. Ron Hubbard in 1960. It involves an "Ethics officer" probing the thoughts, attitudes and behavior of an individual member by asking them large numbers of questions. The bulk of the questions deal with criminal or sexual activity or intentions, or other things that the interviewee might be ashamed of. The questions also probe negative thoughts that the person might have about Scientology or Hubbard. As with "auditing", the subject holds the electrodes of the E-meter, a pseudoscientific device that measures electrical conductivity in the human body, while they are given a series of highly probing, personal questions.

Hubbard described security checking as a remedy for "unreasonable action", specifically "the compulsion or obsession to commit actions" the person feels must be kept secret. Checks are given to all Scientologists on the Bridge to Total Freedom, every six months to all Operating Thetans, according to officials, "to make sure they're using the tech correctly", and to members who are leaving staff.

In a "Code of Reform" issued in 1968, Hubbard announced that he was cancelling security checks, along with the policies of Fair Game and Disconnection. However, later Scientology documents refer to the practice, and former members report that it still continues.

Sec Checks are also known within the Church of Scientology as "Integrity Processing" or "Confessional Auditing".

Security checks
A security check resembles the confessional in traditional religions. However, it also differs from them in that it is not voluntary. Hubbard told security checkers that "you are not merely an observer, or an auditor, you are a detective."

Susan Raine of the University of Alberta observes that the questions asked in security checks show that L. Ron Hubbard was intensely preoccupied with scrutiny, surveillance and betrayal. She notes that this intense form of surveillance makes sense from a bureaucratic perspective as a way of making sure all individuals follow (and internalize) the organisational goals. Bent Corydon, an ex-Scientologist, compares security checking to the use of thought police in the novel Nineteen Eighty-Four. He writes that Scientologists are punished for having negative thoughts about Hubbard or Scientology and so learn to think only positively. David Mayo, another former member, reported that sec checks included the question, "Have you ever had any unkind thoughts about LRH?" and that such "discreditable thoughts" could land a follower in trouble.

In 1972, the South African Commission of Enquiry published a report on Scientology. It recommended that there should be legislation against sec checks. However, no legislative action was taken as a result.

HGC Pre-processing Security Check
HGC stands for "Hubbard Guidance Centre". Sociologist Roy Wallis quotes some questions from this security check dating from 1961.
Are you a pervert?
Are you guilty of any major crimes in this lifetime?
Have you been sent here knowingly to injure Scientology?
Are you or have you ever been a Communist?

Johannesburg Security Check
The Johannesburg (also known as "Joburg") Security Check  was described by Hubbard as "the roughest security check in Scientology". An amended form continued to be used for some time thereafter.

Amongst Hubbard's list of primarily crime-related questions is the question "Have you ever slept with a member of a race of another color?" Other questions include:

Have you ever embezzled money?
Have you ever been a drug addict?
Have you ever bombed anything?
Have you ever murdered anyone?
Have you ever raped anyone?
Have you ever had anything to do with a baby farm?

Only Valid Security Check
The contents of the Joburg security check were later revised into what became "The Only Valid Security Check". Added to the Sec Check are new questions such as:
Do you collect sexual objects?
Do you have a secret you are afraid I'll find out?
Are you upset by this security check?
Have you ever had unkind thoughts about L. Ron Hubbard?Hubbard, L. Ron (1961) "The Only Valid Security Check" Hubbard Communication Office Policy Letter, 22 May 1961

Auditor's Sec Check
This sec check, comprising 170 questions, was meant for staff auditors and field auditors.
Do you hope you won't be found out?
Do you think there is anything wrong with having your privacy invaded?
What do you wish you hadn't done?
Are you upset by this security check? Hubbard, L. Ron (1961) "Auditor's Sec Check" Hubbard Communication Office Policy Letter, 7 July 1961

Security Check Children
Designed to be applied to children aged 6 to 12. Issued by Hubbard as HCO Bulletin of 21 September 1961, also known as HCO WW Security Form 8. The procedure runs through 100 questions, such as:

What has somebody told you not to tell?
Have you ever decided you didn't like some member of your family?
Have you ever taken something belonging to somebody else and never given it back?
Have you ever pretended to be sick (ill)?
Have you ever made yourself sick (ill) or hurt yourself to make somebody sorry?

Whole Track Security Check
This long Sec Check, consisting of hundreds of questions, takes stock of the subject's entire time track, including their "recollections" of any "past lives" they believe they have had. It includes questions such as:
Did you come to Earth for evil purposes?
Have you ever smothered a baby?
Have you ever enslaved a population?
Have you ever destroyed a culture?
Have you ever torn out someone's tongue?
Have you ever zapped anyone?
Have you ever eaten a human body?
Have you ever made a planet, or nation, radioactive?

Controversy

Potential blackmail

Scientology researcher Jon Atack — a critic of Scientology, and himself a former Scientologist  — explains in his book A Piece of Blue Sky that sec checks could be applied either as a "confidential" confessional or as a non-confidential investigation. He alleges that former members have been silenced by the fear that their "confidential" secrets will be used in blackmail against them.

References

External links

Security checks
Religion-related lists